1189 Terentia, provisional designation , is a carbonaceous Terentian asteroid from the outer regions of the asteroid belt, approximately 56 kilometers in diameter and the namesake of its family. The asteroid was discovered by Russian astronomer Grigory Neujmin at Simeiz Observatory on 17 September 1930.

Classification 

Terentia is the namesake of the Terentia family, a small asteroid family of less than a hundred known members of a carbonaceous C-type composition orbiting in the outer main-belt.

Orbit 

Terentia orbits the Sun at a distance of 2.6–3.3 AU once every 5.01 years (1,832 days). Its orbit has an eccentricity of 0.12 and an inclination of 10° with respect to the ecliptic. The body's observation arc begins at Simeiz, 5 days after its official discovery observation.

Physical characteristics 

In the SMASS taxonomy, is classified as a Ch-type, a hydrated subtype of the carbonaceous C-type asteroids.

Naming 

This minor planet was named after Lidiya Terent'eva (1879–1933), female collaborator at the Simeis Observatory.

References

External links 
 Asteroid Lightcurve Database (LCDB), query form (info )
 Dictionary of Minor Planet Names, Google books
 Asteroids and comets rotation curves, CdR – Observatoire de Genève, Raoul Behrend
 Discovery Circumstances: Numbered Minor Planets (1)-(5000) – Minor Planet Center
 
 

001189
Discoveries by Grigory Neujmin
Named minor planets
001189
19300917